The Madras Gymkhana Club (MGC) is a club in Chennai, India, which was founded in 1884 to promote sports and social and cultural activities. It owns and operates one of Chennai's two 18-hole golf courses, one of Asia's oldest courses. Tamil Nadu Governor Surjit Singh Barnala published The Glory Years, a coffee-table book commemorating the club's 125th anniversary, in 2009.

History

The club was founded in April 1884. Early membership was restricted to garrison members, British executives and some upper-caste Indians. A tent was erected, and early activities included polo and pigsticking. The Raja of Venkatagiri donated a grandstand. In addition to playing polo, members began trap shooting and playing cards, rugby, tennis and golf. The South Indian rajas made donations for buildings, billiard tables and polo ponies.
 
The club's history is intertwined with the history of India. Although an ordinance expelled its German members at the onset of the First World War, the club later learned that most of the German settlers had already fled. Women were allowed to join the club as "Independent Lady Members" from 1971.
 
A bowling green was established, along with a ballroom in the paddock. Dance nights concluded with grand suppers, where dancers were photographed. A swimming pool was built, at which the American Olympic gold medalist Sammy Lee performed a diving exhibition. The club kitchen was upgraded with an ice-making plant, an ice–cream machine and freezer. A miniature golf course was built, and the bar was renovated.

Accommodations
The club has 15 rooms: three deluxe, six regular and six suites. Accommodations are provided for members of domestic and internationally affiliated clubs. All rooms are air-conditioned.

Sports

The club has four lighted tennis courts, and Vijay Amritraj played there. It has hosted several International Tennis Federation tournaments and the women's national championships. The club also has a gym, swimming pool, billiards, table tennis and a cards room.

Other facilities
The MGC also has a sports shop, salon, beauty parlour, ice-cream parlour and book and DVD libraries.

Guindy annexe
Originally on the Island Grounds, the golf course was moved to Guindy around 1887. It originally had nine holes before increasing to 14, 16 and 18 holes. Golf here was originally played off the browns; the transition to greens occurred during the 1980s. The Guindy course was known for its roughs, made challenging by the shifting wind. The 6,325/5765-yard course is within the  oval of the Guindy Race Course.

Ross Thompson was the first captain of the golf club. The first inter-club competition between the MGC and the Bangalore Golf Club was held in 1878, and it remains the world's oldest continuing competition between two golf clubs. In 2002, the golf club celebrated its 125th anniversary.

The par-70 course is about 6,258 yards off the regular tees. There are also ladies tees and a set of championship tee boxes. It has over 50 bunkers, most guarding the relatively-small greens.

See also

 Guindy Links
 Cosmopolitan Club

References

External links 

 Website

Sport in Chennai
Golf clubs and courses in Tamil Nadu
1886 establishments in British India
Sports venues in Chennai